Kukurá (Cucurá, Kokura) is a spurious language, fabricated by an interpreter in Brazil.

History
When Alberto Vojtěch Frič visited Rio Verde, Brazil, in 1901 he took with him a Kainguá Indian called Guzmán who said he spoke the language of the local Chavante people.

A word list was published for the so-called Kukurá language, thought to be an isolate, in 1931.

In 1932 Curt Nimuendajú, who had visited the Rio Verde in 1909 and 1913, showed that Guzmán's wordlist consisted half of fake words and half of mispronounced Guaraní. There was no resemblance to the Ofayé language that was actually spoken in the region.

Vocabulary
Loukotka (1968) lists the following basic vocabulary items for the spurious language.

{| class="wikitable"
! gloss !! Kukura
|-
| tongue || 
|-
| stone || 
|-
| moon || 
|-
| house || 
|}

References 

Linguistic hoaxes
Languages of Brazil
Indigenous languages of South America
Spurious languages
Constructed languages introduced in the 1900s
1901 in Brazil
1901 introductions